Saryshevo (Harış) is a rural locality (a village) in Chebenlinsky Selsoviet, Alsheyevsky District, Bashkortostan, Russia. The population was 180 as of 2010. There are 3 streets.

Geography 
Saryshevo is located 25 km south of Rayevsky (the district's administrative centre) by road. Tyubeteyevo is the nearest rural locality.

References 

Rural localities in Alsheyevsky District